Confessions of Felix Krull is a 1957 West German comedy and drama film directed by Kurt Hoffmann and starring Horst Buchholz, Liselotte Pulver, and Ingrid Andree. It is based on the 1954 novel of the same title by Thomas Mann. The story was later made into a 1982 television series The Confessions of Felix Krull. It was shot at the Wandsbek Studios in Hamburg and on location in Lisbon. The film's sets were designed by the art director Robert Herlth. Mann's novel was made into a movie again in 2021.

Main cast

References

Bibliography 
 Bock, Hans-Michael & Bergfelder, Tim. The Concise CineGraph. Encyclopedia of German Cinema. Berghahn Books, 2009.

External links 
 
 Confessions of Felix Krull at filmportal.de/en

1957 films
1957 comedy-drama films
German comedy-drama films
West German films
1950s German-language films
Films based on works by Thomas Mann
Films directed by Kurt Hoffmann
Films shot at Wandsbek Studios
1957 comedy films
1957 drama films
Films set in the 1890s
1950s German films